Harter Township is one of twelve townships in Clay County, Illinois, USA.  As of the 2010 census, its population was 6,394 and it contained 2,948 housing units.

Geography

Cities, towns, villages
 Flora (west three-quarters)

Unincorporated towns
 Kenner
(This list is based on USGS data and may include former settlements.)

Cemeteries
The township contains these seven cemeteries: Elmwood, Garden of Memories, Golden, Jenkins, Logan Family, Meisenheimer and Saint Stephens.

Major highways
  US Route 45
  US Route 50

Airports and landing strips
 Clay County Hospital Heliport

Lakes
 Trago Lake

Landmarks
 Charley Brown Park

Demographics

School districts
 Flora Community Unit School District 35
 North Clay Community Unit School District 25

Political districts
 Illinois' 19th congressional district
 State House District 108
 State Senate District 54

References
 
 United States Census Bureau 2007 TIGER/Line Shapefiles
 United States National Atlas

External links
 City-Data.com
 Illinois State Archives

Townships in Clay County, Illinois
Townships in Illinois